Koryan  may refer to:

People

 Koji Nishio, a Japanese Tetris player
 Ruslan Koryan, an Armenian professional footballer
 Arshak Koryan, a Russian professional footballer